Farahanaz ”Farah” Faisal is the Maldivian High Commissioner to London. She served from 2009 until 2012 under President Mohamed Nasheed and was eappointed on April 18, 2019, by President Ibrahim Mohamed Solih. Faisal is co-accredited as ambassador to France and Ireland.

She was named non-resident ambassador to Spain in 2010.

Early life and education
Faisal earned her undergraduate degree in international relations from Keele University in 1989 followed by a M.Phil. in the same subject from the University of Cambridge in 1996. Her doctorate is in politics. She received it from the University of Hull in 1996.

Honors and awards
Diplomat magazine, in 2022, named her Diplomat of the Year from Asia and Oceania making her the first Maldivian to win one of the magazine's awards.

References

High Commissioners of the Maldives to the United Kingdom
Ambassadors to France
Ambassadors to Spain
Women ambassadors
Alumni of the University of Hull
Alumni of the University of Cambridge
Alumni of Keele University
Living people
Year of birth missing (living people)